Panjang Island is an island located in the Jepara, Central Java. The island has an area of 19 hectares and is located 1.5 nautical miles from Kartini Beach, Jepara.

Geography 
Panjang Island has white sand and is surrounded by shallow seas and coral reefs. There is a tropical forest in the middle of this island, with large trees interspersed with shrubs and bushes. It is as a breeding place for sea birds. The flora on this island is dominated by the trees Cotton, Tamarind, Dadap, and Pine.

References

Tourism in Jepara
Islands of Central Java
Tourist attractions in Central Java